El Transparente is a Baroque altarpiece in the ambulatory of the Cathedral of Toledo. Its name refers to the unique illumination provided by a large skylight cut very high up into the thick wall across the ambulatory, and another hole cut into the back of the altarpiece itself to allow shafts of sunlight to strike the tabernacle. This lower hole also allows persons in the ambulatory to see through the altarpiece to the tabernacle, as if were transparent, so to speak. It was created in 1729-1732 by Narciso Tomé and his four sons (two architects, one painter and one sculptor). The use of light and of mixed materials (marble, bronze, paint, stucco) may reflect the influence of Bernini's Cathedra Petri in St Peter's Basilica, Rome.

Its execution was ordered by Diego de Astorga y Céspedes, Archbishop of Toledo. The Bishop wished to mark the presence of the Holy Sacrament with a glorious monument. The monument cost 200,000 ducats and aroused great enthusiasm, even a celebratory poem wherein the monument was acclaimed 'the Eighth Wonder of the World'. Cardinal Astorga y Céspedes is buried at the feet of El Transparente.

According to American writer James Michener's book Iberia (1968), the Transparente was installed to allow light to pass from the ambulatory behind the high altar (or 'reredos' as he calls it), onto the tabernacle (container for the Blessed Sacrament) which stayed in constant shadow because of the tall reredos. 

Not only was a skylight cut into the top of the thick back wall of the cathedral across the ambulatory behind the high altar, but another hole was cut into the high altar itself to allow the shafts of sunlight to illuminate the tabernacle like a spotlight. 

After the two holes were cut, Tomé and his sons designed a way to visually connect the two by sculpting a fantastic company of angels, saints, prophets and cardinals. Abstract designs suggesting flowing robes and foliage hang over corners to mask the details of the architectural piercings. Along the edges of the skylight they arranged an array of Biblical figures who seem to tumble into the cathedral. At the outer edge of the opening sits Christ on a bank of clouds and surrounded by angels. The back side of the altarpiece was converted to a tower of marble which reaches from the floor to the ceiling. Intricate groups of figures were assembled so that the opening to the tabernacle could be hidden yet permit light to pass through.

References

External links 

Baroque sculptures
Buildings and structures in Toledo, Spain
1732 works
El Transparente de la catedral de Toledo